Mount Holdsworth is a rural locality and a statistical area in the Carterton District and Wellington Region of New Zealand's North Island. The locality is about 17 km north of Carterton by road, and the statistical area covers the entire district north and west of Carterton. The main eastern entrance to the Tararua Forest Park is from Mount Holdsworth.

Demographics 

Mount Holdsworth had a population of 1,767 at the 2018 New Zealand census, an increase of 240 people (15.7%) since the 2013 census, and an increase of 426 people (31.8%) since the 2006 census. There were 669 households. There were 891 males and 879 females, giving a sex ratio of 1.01 males per female. The median age was 46.3 years (compared with 37.4 years nationally), with 336 people (19.0%) aged under 15 years, 243 (13.8%) aged 15 to 29, 918 (52.0%) aged 30 to 64, and 273 (15.4%) aged 65 or older.

Ethnicities were 94.2% European/Pākehā, 10.0% Māori, 1.5% Pacific peoples, 1.2% Asian, and 2.7% other ethnicities (totals add to more than 100% since people could identify with multiple ethnicities).

The proportion of people born overseas was 18.7%, compared with 27.1% nationally.

Although some people objected to giving their religion, 54.5% had no religion, 35.3% were Christian, 0.2% were Hindu, 0.2% were Buddhist and 1.7% had other religions.

Of those at least 15 years old, 309 (21.6%) people had a bachelor or higher degree, and 258 (18.0%) people had no formal qualifications. The median income was $35,100, compared with $31,800 nationally. The employment status of those at least 15 was that 762 (53.2%) people were employed full-time, 270 (18.9%) were part-time, and 51 (3.6%) were unemployed.

References

Carterton District
Populated places in the Wellington Region